William Stapleton Trollope (31 July 1854 – 20 September 1895) was an English first-class cricketer active in the years 1877–87, who played for Surrey. He was born in South Lambeth and died in Southampton.

References

1854 births
1895 deaths
English cricketers
Surrey cricketers